Leandro Zamora Rivero (born 11 March 1996) is a Cuban athlete specialising in the 400 metres hurdles. He won a bronze medal at the 2018 Ibero-American Championships. He represented his country in the 4 × 400 metres relay at the 2017 World Championships.

International competitions

Personal bests
Outdoor
200 metres – 21.88 (+1.2 m/s Havana 2016)
400 metres – 46.19 (Querétaro 2018)
800 metres – 1:59.37 (Camagüey 2014)
400 metres hurdles – 49.10 (Querétaro 2018)

References

1996 births
Living people
Cuban male hurdlers
World Athletics Championships athletes for Cuba
Competitors at the 2018 Central American and Caribbean Games
Central American and Caribbean Games gold medalists for Cuba
Athletes (track and field) at the 2019 Pan American Games
Pan American Games competitors for Cuba
Central American and Caribbean Games medalists in athletics
20th-century Cuban people
21st-century Cuban people